Jean Gordon may refer to:

Jean Gordon (countess of Bothwell), first wife of James Hepburn, 4th Earl of Bothwell
Jean Gordon (Gypsy) (died 1746), Gypsy queen, the basis for the character Meg Merrilies in Sir Walter Scott's novel Guy Mannering
John Gordon (bishop) (1544–1619), Dean of Salisbury, called "Jean Gordon" while he lived in France
Jean Gordon (politician) (1918–2008), Canadian politician
Jean Gordon (publisher) (died 1985) associate publisher (1952–1985) and owner (1970–1985) of US-based Dance Magazine
Jean Gordon (Red Cross) (1915–1946), niece & debated involvement with General George S. Patton in World War II
Jean Margaret Gordon (1865–1931), American suffragist

See also
John Gordon (disambiguation)
Jane Gordon (disambiguation)